The Sacrifice is an independent film by James Fessenden that was first shown at Gaylaxicon in 2005. It is a horror/psychological thriller that centers on a high school boy who becomes embroiled in an occult mystery in a quiet New Hampshire town.

Plot

Three years after the death of his father, 16-year-old Jonathan Kelly (Robert Kersey) is still depressed and withdrawn.  When he moves with his mother to the small New Hampshire town of Dunkirk, he is immediately drawn to David (David Snyder), a boy who shares his interest in the occult.

But when the boys try to satisfy their curiosity about a local ghost story, they discover that somebody is digging up graves in the oldest part of the cemetery, collecting human remains for a dark ritual.

The plot then revolves around the two boys' exploration of the town's surprisingly dark history while the ritual (and planned human sacrifice) approaches.

External links

2005 films
2005 horror films
American LGBT-related films
American supernatural horror films
Films set in New Hampshire
LGBT-related horror films
Films shot in New Hampshire
2000s American films